Grammatikopoulos (masculine) or Grammatikopoulou (feminine) is a Greek surname, derived from γραμματέας "grammateas", meaning secretary. Notable people with the surname include:

Achilleas Grammatikopoulos (1908–2008), Greek footballer
Panagiotis Grammatikopoulos (born 1959), Greek weightlifter
Serafim Grammatikopoulos (born 1960), Greek weightlifter
Valentini Grammatikopoulou (born 1997), Greek tennis player

Greek-language surnames
Occupational surnames